Bastilla amygdalis is a moth of the family Noctuidae. It is found in the Indian subregion, Sri Lanka, Taiwan, Thailand, Sumatra and Borneo.

Description
Its wingspan is about 52 mm. Body dark red brown, suffused with lilacine grey. Forewings with antemedial line bent outwards below the cell. The apical streak with its outer edge indented. There are three white specks can be seen on costa before apex. Hindwings with central part of outer area much paler.

The larvae feed on Phyllanthus species

References

External links
Species info

Bastilla (moth)
Moths of Asia
Moths described in 1885